Raimond L. Winslow (born 1955) is an American biomedical engineer and computational biologist.

He enrolled at Johns Hopkins University, where he was awarded a Ph.D. in Biomedical Engineering in 1986.

In 2003, Winslow was recognized by IBM as a winner of the IBM Life Sciences Institutes of Innovation Award.

In 2005, Winslow was appointed director of the Johns Hopkins Institute for Computational Medicine. In 2010 Winslow was named the Raj and Neera Singh Professor for his accomplishments as an interdisciplinary researcher and pioneer in the field of computational medicine.

References 

Living people
Johns Hopkins University alumni
Johns Hopkins University faculty
Washington University in St. Louis faculty
University of Minnesota faculty
American biomedical engineers
American bioinformaticians
Fellows of the American Institute for Medical and Biological Engineering
Fellows of the Biomedical Engineering Society
1955 births
Worcester Polytechnic Institute alumni